Thysanodesma is a genus of moths of the family Crambidae.

Species
Thysanodesma major Butler, 1889
Thysanodesma praeteritalis (Walker, 1859)

References

External links
Natural History Museum Lepidoptera genus database

Pyraustinae
Crambidae genera
Taxa named by Arthur Gardiner Butler